The Freight Hoppers are an American old time string band, formed in 1992. Their repertoire includes music that was first recorded in the late 1920s and early 1930s, and spans geographically from Mississippi to West Virginia. Its members include fiddle and banjo players Barry Benjamin and Frank Lee, with Allie Burbrink on guitar and vocals and Bradley Adams on string bass.  Based in the Smoky Mountains of North Carolina, The Freight Hoppers draw from rural southern music for their inspiration.

The band were featured on Garrison Keillor's nationally syndicated radio show A Prairie Home Companion on National Public Radio in 1996, winning second place in the show's Talent from Towns Under 2000 contest. They recorded two albums on Rounder Records: "Where'd you come from, Where'd you go?" (1996)  and "Waiting on the Gravy Train" (1998). The Freight Hoppers reformed in 2007 after a five-year hiatus during which fiddler David Bass underwent heart transplant surgery.

The Freight Hoppers third album is 'Mile Marker',released in 2010.

Discography 
 The Freight Hoppers: Where'd You Come From Where'd You Go? (Rounder Records, 1996)
 The Freight Hoppers: Waiting on the Gravy Train (Rounder Records, 1998)
Mile Marker (BTR Records, 2010)

References

External links 
[ Allmusic.com: Biography]
 FiddleAid Benefit for David Bass's heart transplant described on The Old-Time Herald website
 Freighthoppers page on Stringband.com
 David Bass wins Second place in the Old-time fiddlers contest at the 2005 Galax Fiddler's Convention
 Review of Where'd You Come From Where'd You Go? by Arthur Berman
 Article about Freighthoppers reforming and signing with Roe Records

Videographic documentation 

 YouTube video of Bass playing with the Forge Mountain Diggers
  YouTube video of Bass playing with the Forge Mountain Diggers at Watermelon Park Fest in Berryville, VA
 YouTube video of Bass playing Backstep Cindy with the Forge Mountain Diggers
 YouTube video of Bass playing fiddle with the Freighthoppers
  YouTube video of Bass playing  Sally Ann with the Freighthoppers at the Free State Music Festival in Lawrence, KS

American bluegrass music groups
American fiddlers
Old-time musicians
Old-time bands
American folk musical groups
American country music groups
Musicians from Appalachia
Performing arts pages with videographic documentation